Chulkana  is a village situated in Haryana, India. It comes under district Panipat, municipality Samalkha. The village is situated 3.7 km away from Samalkha. The main landmark is the Baba Lakisher temple, situated in the center of the village. Chulkana is moderately populated. The Chokker clan of Gurjar resides here.

References

Shree Shyam Baba Mandir is situated in the south of village chulkana. The Temple has three gates in the East, West and South. The South Gate is situated at the Phirni of the Village. The East Gate and the South Gate both are used by devotees to enter in the temple.The Shyam Baba Mandir is about 400 years old. It is says that Barbrik Son of Ghatotkach and The Grandson of Bhim give his head to Lord Krishna before the Mahabharta Yudh. Thus says that "Jahan diya tha Shish ka Daan, Vo Bhumi hai chulkana Dham". Then Lord Krishna gave him a Vardan "Kalyug me thumahari mere naam se pooja hogi". Now Barbrik is known as Shree Shyam Baba.

External links
 haryana.gov.in

Villages in Panipat district

bn:সামালখা
es:Chulkana
bpy:সামালখা
it:Chulkana
pt:Chulkana
vi:Chulkana